The Pardo River is a river of Bahia and Minas Gerais states in eastern Brazil.

See also
List of rivers of Bahia
List of rivers of Minas Gerais

References
Brazilian Ministry of Transport (Bahia)
Brazilian Ministry of Transport (Minas Gerais)

Rivers of Bahia
Rivers of Minas Gerais